La Más Completa Colección is a posthumous compilation album by Regional Mexican singer Jenni Rivera, released on December 18, 2012.

Track listing

Disc 1

Disc 2

Chart performance

Sales and certifications

References

2012 compilation albums
Jenni Rivera compilation albums
Fonovisa Records compilation albums
Spanish-language compilation albums